The Sanjak of Zor was a sanjak of the Ottoman Empire, which was created in 1857. Some of its area was separated from the Baghdad Vilayet. Zor was sometimes mentioned as being part of the Aleppo Vilayet, or of the Syria Vilayet.

The capital was Deir Ez-Zor, a town on the right (i.e., south) bank of the Euphrates, which was also the only considerable town of the sanjak. The capital itself was just a village before becoming the centre of the sanjak.

After the fall of the Ottoman Empire in 1918, Ottoman forces withdrew from the area leaving a no man's land. The region was subsequently occupied by Iraqi nationalists representing the Arab Kingdom of Syria in Damascus, and after the Paulet–Newcombe Agreement in 1923, it became part of the French Mandate for Syria.

Administrative divisions

Kazas of the Sanjak:
 Kaza of Deyr
 Kaza of Resü'l Ayn
 Kaza of Asare
 Kaza of Ebukemal

References

Deir ez-Zor
Aleppo vilayet
History of Upper Mesopotamia
1857 establishments in the Ottoman Empire